Homoranthus tricolor, is a flowering plant in the family Myrtaceae and is endemic to a small area in south-east Queensland. It is an upright shrub with linear to lance-shaped leaves and green, red and black flowers arranged singly or in pairs in upper leaf axils.

Description
It has grey, slightly lined, fibrous bark near the base of older plants. The pendulous, cylindrical shaped flowers have elliptic-shaped dark purple to black petals near the base, light green on the margins and toward the apex. There have been sightings of flowers in September only, but may flower into October.

Taxonomy and naming
Homoranthus tricolor was first formally described in 2009 by Anthony Bean from a specimen he collected south-west of Mundubbera in 2008. The description was published in Austrobaileya. The specific epithet (tricolor) refers to the three-coloured flowers.

Distribution and habitat 
This homoranthus grows in shrubby woodland on a sandstone ridge. It is only known from a single population near Mundubbera.

Conservation status
A rare species, currently known from a single population which is subjected to occasional grazing. Criteria of Briggs and Leigh (1996) a ROTAP conservation code of 2E appropriate.  IUCN (2010) considered endangered.

References

External links
 The Australasian Virtual Herbarium – Occurrence data for Homoranthus tricolor

tricolor
Flora of Queensland
Plants described in 2009
Myrtales of Australia